Carl Martin Lovsted, Jr. (April 4, 1930 – November 8, 2013) was an American rower. In 1952 he competed in the Summer Olympics as a crew member of the American boat which won the bronze medal in the coxed four event. He was born in Manila, Philippines and died in Bellevue, Washington.

External links
Carl Lovsted's profile at Sports Reference.com
Carl Lovsted's obituary

1930 births
2013 deaths
Rowers at the 1952 Summer Olympics
Olympic bronze medalists for the United States in rowing
American male rowers
Medalists at the 1952 Summer Olympics